August Kanitz (25 April 1843, Lugos — 12 July 1896, Kolozsvár) was a Hungarian botanist. 

While a student at the University of Vienna he wrote Geschichte der Botanik in Ungarn (Hanover and Budapest, 1863), and soon after, Versuch einer Geschichte der Ungarischen Botanik (Halle, 1865). In 1866 he published a work on the flora of Slavonia, in 1877 he published a work  on the flora  of Montenegro, Bosnia, and Serbia and in 1879 one on that of Romania. For the last-named work he was elected (1880) a member of the Hungarian Academy of Sciences, and was made Knight of the Order of the Crown of Romania. He converted to Christianity.

In 1872 Kanitz was appointed professor of botany at the Franz Joseph University. In 1877 he founded the Magyar Növénytani Lapok (Hungarian Journal of Botany), which he edited until 1892.

See also
 Josif Pančić
 Sava Petrović
 Nedeljko Košanin

References 

1843 births
1896 deaths
19th-century Hungarian botanists
Botanists active in Europe
Botanical writers
Horticulturists
University of Vienna alumni
Academic staff of Franz Joseph University
Austro-Hungarian writers
Members of the Hungarian Academy of Sciences
People from Lugoj
Academic journal editors
Knights of the Order of the Crown (Romania)